A perpetual student or career student is a college or university attendee who re-enrolls for several years more than is necessary to obtain a given degree, or who pursues multiple terminal degrees. Perpetual students might publish or work in several fields.

Examples
 Luciano Baietti (born September 1, 1947) holds fifteen academic degrees, including the subjects of physical education, law, literature, philosophy, sociology, criminology, and military strategy. The Guinness Book of World Records officially recognizes Baietti as the most graduated living person in the world.
 Dr. Robert W. McGee - Holder of 23 academic degrees including 13 doctorates.
 Dr. Bruce Berry (1940-2014), notable for being a school crossing guard, having retired from a career including technical document translation for Agfa-Gevaert, working for the Post Office, and teaching, took his first degree from Manchester University in 1963. He continued to study from the 1970s onwards, coming to possess several further Bachelor's and master's degrees (from universities including the University of Leeds, the University of York and Normandy University, Caen), as well as a Ph.D. from Leeds Metropolitan University. He died before completing his twelfth degree, another Ph.D. Fluent in several languages, he was also a Fellow of the Chartered Institute of Linguists.
 Benjamin Bolger, who received his first four-year degree from the University of Michigan has seventeen degrees from different colleges.
Milton De Jesús has been a student at the University of Puerto Rico since 1963. In 2010, De Jesús was interviewed by the newspaper, since he was the only student on the campus who could compare the 2010 student strikes and the 1970s, 80s, 90s, and 2005 strikes. According to his Facebook page, De Jesús graduated from the University of Puerto Rico in 2005.
 Shrikant Jichkar  (14 September 1954 – 2 June 2004)  held twenty academic degrees.
 Johnny Lechner attended the University of Wisconsin–Whitewater from 1994 to at least 2005. He was scheduled to graduate in 2008 with multiple majors and minors, but continued into a 15th year of college.
 Michael Nicholson (1941?- Present) has 28 degrees, including 22 master's degrees and one doctorate.
 V. N. Parthiban holds the overall record for the most degrees earned in history, with one hundred forty-five.

References

Further reading

Types of students